Lotar Olias (1913–1990) was a German composer who worked on numerous film scores. He composed the tune of the 1953 song You, You, You.

Selected filmography
 Artists' Blood (1949)
 The Thief of Bagdad (1952)
 That Can Happen to Anyone (1952)
 Fritz and Friederike (1952)  
 Salto Mortale (1953)
 The Uncle from America (1953)
 Everything for Father (1953)
 Money from the Air (1954)
 Roses from the South (1954)
 Marriage Sanitarium (1955)
 Emperor's Ball (1956)
 The Big Chance (1957)
 The Blue Moth (1959)
 The Night Before the Premiere (1959)
 Freddy, the Guitar and the Sea (1959)
 Freddy and the Melody of the Night (1960)
 Freddy and the Millionaire (1961)
 Freddy in the Wild West (1964)

References

Bibliography
 Tyler, Don. Hit Songs, 1900-1955: American Popular Music of the Pre-Rock Era. McFarland, 2007.

External links

1913 births
1990 deaths
20th-century German composers
German male composers
Musicians from Königsberg
20th-century German male musicians